Ghulam Mohammed Giri (5 March 1937 – 27 April 2021) also known by his pen name Marghoob Banihali was a Kashmiri poet from Bankoot, Banihal, in the state of Jammu and Kashmir.

Personal life 
Marghoob lost his mother when he was 8, and father when he was 14. He worked in various capacities at the University of Kashmir, in the Department of Kashmiri Language, the Department of Central Asian Studies, and the Iqbal Institute.

Death

Marghoob Banihali died on 27 April 2021 at his home in Srinagar.

Literary work 
Banihali was awarded the Sahitya Akademi Award for Kashmiri literature in 1979 for his collection of poetry - Partavistan.
He returned his Sahitya Akademi award against the rising intolerance and communal violence in the state of Jammu and Kashmir that resulted in the death of Zahid Bhat, a youth from Batengoo in South Kashmir.

Awards and notable achievements 
 Sahitya Academy Award for Kashmiri literature (1979), for Partavistan

See also 
List of Sahitya Akademi Award winners for Kashmiri

References 

1937 births
2021 deaths
Kashmiri poets
Recipients of the Sahitya Akademi Award in Kashmiri
People from Srinagar